Cephetola pinodes, or Druce's epitola, is a butterfly in the family Lycaenidae. The species was first described by Hamilton Herbert Druce in 1890. It is found in Sierra Leone, Ivory Coast, Ghana, Nigeria, Cameroon, the Republic of the Congo, the Central African Republic, the Democratic Republic of the Congo, Uganda and Tanzania.

Subspecies
Cephetola pinodes pinodes (Sierra Leone, Ivory Coast, Ghana, western Nigeria)
Cephetola pinodes budduana (Talbot, 1937) (eastern Nigeria, Cameroon, Congo, Central African Republic, Democratic Republic of the Congo, Uganda, north-western Tanzania)

References

External links
Die Gross-Schmetterlinge der Erde 13: Die Afrikanischen Tagfalter. Plate XIII 65 a

Butterflies described in 1890
Poritiinae
Butterflies of Africa